Live Is Life is the first live album by Austrian pop rock band Opus. It was released in 1984 on the OK Musica label. It includes the song "Live Is Life", which was a worldwide hit. The album peaked at #1 in Austria.

Track listing

Charts

Weekly charts

Year-end charts

References

Opus (Austrian band) albums
1984 live albums
Polydor Records albums